Eurylophella is a genus of spiny crawler mayflies in the family Ephemerellidae. There are about 18 described species in Eurylophella.

Species
These 18 species belong to the genus Eurylophella:

 Eurylophella aestiva (McDunnough, 1931)
 Eurylophella bicolor (Clemens, 1913)
 Eurylophella bicoloroides (McDunnough, 1938)
 Eurylophella doris (Traver, 1934)
 Eurylophella enoensis Funk, 1994
 Eurylophella funeralis (McDunnough, 1925)
 Eurylophella iberica Keffermüller & Da-Terra, 1978
 Eurylophella karelica Tiensuu, 1935
 Eurylophella korneyevi
 Eurylophella lodi (Mayo, 1952)
 Eurylophella lutulenta (Clemens, 1913)
 Eurylophella macdunnoughi Funk, 1994
 Eurylophella minimella (McDunnough, 1931)
 Eurylophella oviruptis Funk in Funk, Jackson & Sweeney, 2008
 Eurylophella poconoensis Funk, 1994
 Eurylophella prudentalis (McDunnough, 1931)
 Eurylophella temporalis (McDunnough, 1924)
 Eurylophella verisimilis (McDunnough, 1930)

References

Further reading

External links

 

Mayflies
Articles created by Qbugbot